"Bejeweled" is a song by American singer-songwriter Taylor Swift, taken from her tenth studio album, Midnights (2022), which was released on October 21, 2022, through Republic Records. Written and produced by Swift and Jack Antonoff, "Bejeweled" is a synth-laden disco, synth-pop, and bubblegum song about one's recognition of their self-worth. It is also a symbolic tune, announcing Swift's return to pop music.

The ninth track on the album, "Bejeweled" was released as a digital promotional single exclusively via Swift's website on October 25 for a limited time period. It was accompanied by a music video written and directed by Swift—a comic take on the story of Cinderella—starring Swift, Antonoff, American actress Laura Dern, rock band Haim, burlesque artist Dita Von Teese, and British make-up artist Pat McGrath. It features several Easter eggs that hint at Swift's next project. The song peaked within the top 10 in Australia, Canada, New Zealand, Singapore, and the Philippines, as well as the United States where it landed at number six on the Billboard Hot 100. "Bejeweled" was performed for the first time on the Eras Tour (2023).

Background
On August 28, 2022, Taylor Swift announced her tenth studio album, Midnights, set for release on October 21, 2022. The track-list was not immediately revealed. Jack Antonoff, a longtime collaborator of Swift who had worked with her since her fifth studio album 1989 (2014), was confirmed as a producer on Midnights by a video posted to Swift's Instagram account on September 16, 2022, titled "The making of Midnights". Beginning on September 21, 2022, Swift began unveiling the tracklist in a randomized order through her short video series on TikTok, called Midnights Mayhem with Me. It consisted of 13 episodes, with one song revealed in every episode. Swift rolls a lottery cage containing 13 ping pong balls numbered from one to thirteen, each representing a track of Midnights, and when a ball drops out, she disclosed the title of the corresponding track on the album, through a telephone. In the seventh episode on October 5, 2022, Swift announced the title of the ninth track as "Bejeweled".

Lyrics and composition 
Music critics described the genre of "Bejeweled" as disco, synth-pop, and bubblegum. The production incorporates prominent electronica touches, driven by a Juno 6 synthesizer. It contains "plinking" and "shimmery" synth arpeggios that burst "into sparklers" during its hooks. The lyrics are about recognizing self-worth; the narrator cautions a male romantic subject to pay attention to her before it is too late. Swift stated the song also acts as a metaphor for her return to pop music—that she is still "bejeweled" enough for pop—after deviating into folk music with her last two studio albums during the COVID-19 pandemic.

Release
On October 16, Swift posted an itinerary to her social media, detailing the events scheduled for the album, entitled Midnights Manifest. It specified a music video release for the album's lead single, "Anti-Hero", on October 21 and "another track" on October 25. Swift later confirmed the undisclosed track to receive a music video is "Bejeweled". Excerpts from the video were shown in a teaser trailer for the album's visuals during Amazon Prime Video's broadcast of Thursday Night Football on October 20. Besides Swift, the cast of the "Bejeweled" music video—Antonoff, Laura Dern, the Haim sisters (Este, Danielle, and Alana), Dita Von Teese, and Pat McGrath—also appeared in the trailer.

Midnights was released on October 21, 2022 at 12:00 EDT, on which "Bejeweled" appears as the ninth track. On October 25, the song was issued for digital download on Swift's website, as a promotional single off the record, for a limited time. An instrumental version followed two days later on October 27, in the same format, also for a limited time.

Critical reception 
"Bejeweled" received critical acclaim from critics. Brittany Spanos of Rolling Stone dubbed "Bejeweled" an "absolute knockout" of a song, "presenting herself as the ultimate prize." Rob Sheffield said the song is an "anxious dance-floor poseur of 'Mirrorball' grown up, but it also feels like the wife from 'Tolerate It' finally breaking free", featuring Swift both boast and be needy. Billboard journalist Jason Lipshutz said a "perfect" song like "Bejeweled" conveys Swift's years of experience as a songwriter. Lipshutz added that song is "a story of refusing to settle into early-thirties ennui". Helen Brown of The Independent wrote, Swift "warns a guy that she has the capacity to light up rooms (and all the boys in the band) if he doesn't pay more attention". Carl Wilson of Slate appreciated the song's lively synths reminiscent of works by Italian record producer Giorgio Moroder and the lyrics about "living well". Saloni Gajjar of The A.V. Club described it as an unapologetic, "feel-good melody meant to be played loudly".

Music video
The music video, written and directed by Swift, premiered on her Vevo channel on YouTube at 00:00 EDT on October 25. It contains many Easter eggs referencing her previous work, particularly the 2010 album Speak Now. The storyline references and provides an ironic twist on the fairy tale Cinderella. In the video, Swift portrays the Cinderella character, only named as "House Wench". She endures mockery from the wicked stepmother character, played by Laura Dern, and the evil stepsisters, played by the members of the band Haim, one of whose vomit Swift is cleaning up. As they leave for the ball, Swift opens a fob watch and becomes transformed into a cloaked queenly figure in a ball gown. She sings the second verse in a golden Art Deco-inspired elevator on her way to the ball on the third floor of a skyscraper. The elevator contains an Easter egg wherein the color of each elevator button represents every album Swift has released as of the music video's release, with the thirteenth and last button, which is purple, possibly representing Speak Now, hinting that it may be Swift's next re-released album.

Swift then passes through an environment filled with falling gemstones before taking her cloak off, revealing a black American burlesque-inspired dance outfit. The gems fall into place on her bodysuit and boots, and a bracelet and necklace attach around her wrist and neck.

Exiting the elevator on a higher floor, Swift meets her "fairy goddess" (Dita Von Teese), both wearing silver burlesque-style outfits. After peeling off their stockings they perform a dance number in a pair of giant martini glasses and pour water over themselves from a pair of giant olives. Finally, Swift reaches the thirteenth floor and takes the stage at the ball in a clockwork-inspired setting surrounded by showgirls, wearing a black jewelled two-piece outfit and silver heels. Her act stuns the wicked stepmother and stepsisters, and impresses "Queen Pat" (Pat McGrath). Queen Pat forces Swift to entertain the Prince Charming character (Jack Antonoff), but Swift turns the Prince's marriage proposal down, with a caption specifying that she ghosts him. The music video ends with the Prince shrugging off and accepting Swift's rejection while she enjoys the view from her newly-acquired castle as three dragons fly around it. The music video features orchestral versions of two other Swift songs from Speak Now: "Enchanted" in the beginning and "Long Live" at the end.

Commercial performance 
In the United States, tracks from Midnights occupied the entire top-ten of the Billboard Hot 100; "Bejeweled" debuted at number six on the chart with 35.5 million streams, 16,100 digital downloads sold and 1.6 million in radio audience. Swift became the first artist to simultaneously occupy the top 10 spots of the Hot 100; the female artist with the most top-10 songs (40); and the first act to occupy the entire top-ten of the Hot 100, Streaming Songs, and Digital Songs charts simultaneously. Midnights also became the first album in history to contain ten top-10 songs. The song spent a second consecutive week inside the top 10 of the Hot 100, alongside fellow tracks "Anti-Hero", "Lavender Haze" and "Midnight Rain".

Accolades

Credits and personnel 
Credits are adapted from Pitchfork.
Recording
 Recorded at Rough Customer Studio (Brooklyn) and Electric Lady Studios (New York City)
 Mixed at MixStar Studios (Virginia Beach)
 Mastered at Sterling Sound (Edgewater, New Jersey)
 Mikey Freedom Hart's performance was recorded by David Hart at Big Mercy Sound (Brooklyn)

Personnel
 Taylor Swift – vocals, songwriter, producer
 Jack Antonoff – songwriter, producer, programming, percussion, Juno 6, DX7, OB1, kalimba, Moog, acoustic guitars, bass, background vocals, recording
 Evan Smith – synths, recording
 Mikey Freedom Hart – keys
 Megan Searl – assistant engineer
 John Sher – assistant engineer
 John Rooney – assistant engineer
 Serban Ghenea – mix engineer
 Bryce Bordone – assistant mix engineer
 Randy Merrill – mastering engineer
 Laura Sisk – recording
 David Hart – recording

Charts

Certifications

Release history

References

2022 songs
American disco songs
Taylor Swift songs
Songs written by Taylor Swift
Songs written by Jack Antonoff
Song recordings produced by Taylor Swift
Song recordings produced by Jack Antonoff
American synth-pop songs
Bubblegum pop songs
Works based on Cinderella